Meadow Oaks is an unincorporated community and census-designated place (CDP) in Pasco County, Florida, United States.  Located north of Florida State Road 52 inland from Hudson, it is within the Tampa–St. Petersburg–Clearwater Metropolitan Statistical Area (MSA) and the Southwest Florida Water Management District.

The community was first planned in 1983 to include homes and eponymous golf course, which was later expanded. The clubhouse was destroyed by fire in 1995. The community continued to grow into the 2000s, partly on land that had once been a cattle ranch, to have eight 'villages'.

Meadow Oaks become a CDP (43785) in 2010 and as of the 2010 census its population was 2,442 It had grown to 2,842 by the 2020 census.

Geography

Meadow Oaks is considered an 'inland' or 'landside' Pasco County community. Land-use planning follows the concepts of MPUD zoning.

Meadow Oaks is within Florida's 12th U.S.congressional district, Florida Senate 16th district, and Florida House District 37.

See also
List of census-designated places in Florida

References

Unincorporated communities in Pasco County, Florida
Unincorporated communities in Florida
Census-designated places in Pasco County, Florida
Census-designated places in Florida